John Langdon Bonython  (13 January 19051992), was a prominent Adelaide businessman.

Family
Bonython was born into the old Adelaide family Bonython. His grandfather was John Langdon Bonython, and his father was John Lavington Bonython. His mother was Blanche Ada Bray, and he had two sisters, two half-brothers (Warren Bonython and Kym Bonython), and one half-sister. He married Minnie Hope Rutherford in 1926 and they had three children.

Biography

John Langdon Bonython  was born on 13 January 1905 in Adelaide, South Australia.
He studied at the University of Adelaide, and became a solicitor in 1930. He chaired Advertiser Newspapers Ltd, and on 18 March 1954, he became the founding chairman of the first board of directors of Santos Limited.

In 1982 a deep water port facility at Stony Point 20 km north of Whyalla was connected to the Moomba Adelaide Pipeline System, a 659 km pipeline from Moomba in the Cooper Basin; this facility was named Port Bonython in his honour.

Awards
On 9 June 1980 he was appointed an Officer of the Order of Australia, "in recognition of service to media and to industry".

References

1905 births
1992 deaths
Australian people of Cornish descent
Businesspeople from Adelaide
Officers of the Order of Australia
John
20th-century Australian businesspeople